Havoc in Heaven, also translated as Uproar in Heaven, is a Chinese donghua feature film directed by Wan Laiming and produced by all four of the Wan brothers. The film was created at the height of the Chinese animation industry in the 1960s, and received numerous awards, earning the brothers domestic and international recognition. The story is an adaptation of the earlier episodes of the 16th-century Chinese novel Journey to the West.

The stylized animation and drums and percussion accompaniment used in this film are heavily influenced by Peking opera traditions.

Creators

Background
Wan Guchan, of the Wan Brothers and one of the animators of the feature film Princess Iron Fan, began planning the production of Havoc in Heaven after its release in 1941. However, the project was delayed for over a decade after the Japanese capture of Shanghai during the Second Sino-Japanese War, and later by the Chinese Civil War.

Wan Laiming returned to Shanghai as director of Shanghai Animation Film Studio in 1954, and production of Havoc in Heaven resumed shortly thereafter. The first part of the film was completed in 1961 by Wan Laiming and Wan Guchan. The second part was completed in 1964 with the assistance of Wan Chaochen and Wan Dihuan. Both parts of the film were screened together for the first time in 1965. This was the last major animated film of the Second Golden Era of Cinema of China. A year later, the entire industry was effectively shut down by the Cultural Revolution.

Story

The story is based on the earliest chapters of the Ming Dynasty shenmo novel Journey to the West. The main character is Sun Wukong, aka the Monkey King, who rebels against the Jade Emperor of heaven.

Part One

After a brief prologue showing Sun Wukong being born out of a rock, the first act begins on the Flower and Fruit Mountain with Wukong watching a military parade by his subjects. Delighted with their martial prowess, he decides to put on a display himself but accidentally breaks his royal sword. Annoyed at being unable to find a suitable weapon for himself, Wukong follows an old monkey's suggestion to visit the Dragon King of the Eastern Sea for a possible weapon.

Wukong then dives into the sea and travels to the Dragon King's palace where he asks for a neighborly gift of a weapon.
The Dragon King, amused by the arrogance, orders his soldiers to bring progressively heavier weapons, but Wukong dismisses them all as being too light and flimsy. The Dragon King then takes him to a great pillar which was used by the gods to pin down the sea during the great floods. The pillar is in fact the As-you-will Cudgel, a magical staff weighing eight tons that can change size and Sun Wukong happily takes the weapon. The Dragon King, not expecting Wukong to actually be able to take the great treasure, demands it back, but Wukong rebukes him, saying that the king should not have offered it if he did not want it taken, then returns to his kingdom.

The Dragon King goes to Heaven and petitions the Celestial Emperor for the return of the pillar and to punish Wukong.
General Li quickly offers to send an army, but the God of the North Star suggests that Wukong be given a minor post in Heaven so that he can be kept under close supervision instead. The Emperor agrees to the plan.

The God of the North Star travels to the Flower and Fruit Mountain and tricks Wukong saying that he was to be honored with a title and a post in Heaven. Wukong travels to Heaven and is granted the post of "Head of the Imperial Stables", being misled to believe that it is a high-ranking duty. Wukong arrives at the stables and unhappy with the treatment of the horses, sets them loose, letting them roam freely. Wukong is complimented on the improved health and mood of the horses. Shortly afterwards, however, the General of the Imperial Cavalry arrives to inspect the stables and is furious that the horses are free instead of being stabled, and he confronts Wukong, who then realizes that he has been tricked. He easily defeats the General and returns to the Flower and Fruit Mountain.

The Imperial Court then hears that Wukong has claimed the title of ‘Great Sage Equal of Heaven’, and the furious Emperor orders General Li to capture Wukong. The general sends two of his best soldiers, including the god Nezha, to challenge the Monkey King, but they are defeated easily. General Li threatens to return, but Wukong shouts back defiantly that he and his monkeys will be waiting.

Part Two

An omitted part of the original release shows General Li interrupting the Emperor's tour of his land, requesting additional troops. The God of the North Star interjects, saying that subterfuge is required again and after a short argument, the Emperor agrees to his plan. A short scene of life under the protection of the Monkey King is cut short by the captured God of the North Star being brought to Wukong by monkey soldiers.

The second act opens with the God of the North Star trying to entice Wukong back to Heaven, but the Monkey King is wary, even with Heaven's acceptance of the Monkey King's title. The God makes comments about the Flower and Fruit Mountain, comparing it to the Heavenly Garden, extolling the beauty, scents and fruit compared to earthly delights. Intrigued, Wukong agrees to become the guardian of the Heavenly Garden, another minor post that he is misled to believe is important. Now assumed to be placated, he is left alone in the Garden where he eats the Empress’ peaches of immortality.

A procession of fairies comes to collect peaches for an important Imperial banquet where they are questioned by Wukong about the banquet's guests. When he hears that the Dragon King of the Eastern Sea had been invited, but not the ‘Great Sage Equal of Heaven’, Wukong realises he has been tricked again and flies into a rage. The fairies flee, but Wukong stops them with his magic. He goes to the Imperial banquet hall and after putting all the attendants to sleep, begins to sample the food and wine.

The drunken Monkey King suddenly becomes homesick and steals the entire banquet, putting it into a magical bag for his subjects. He then leaves for the Flower and Fruit Mountain but becomes lost due to his drunkenness, ending up at Lao Tzu’s workshop where he eats the Emperor's Pills of Immortality. The pills sober him up, allowing him to travel home where he is greeted enthusiastically by his monkeys and he opens the bag, allowing his monkeys to enjoy the stolen food.

Meanwhile, the Empress discovers the remains of her banquet and petitions the Emperor to punish Wukong. The fairies then tearfully inform the Emperor that Wukong has eaten many of the peaches in the Heavenly Garden. Finally Lao Tzu comes and tells the Emperor that his Pills of Immortality have been stolen. This time, both General Li and the God of the North Star recommend military action.

The Heavenly army descends on the Flower and Fruit Mountain, where there is heavy fighting between the soldiers and well trained monkeys. Sun Wukong fights and defeats the Four Heavenly Kings, who use a variety of weapons ranging from a sleep-inducing lute to a magical snake. General Li then sends in Erlang Shen and a troop of elite soldiers. Wukong uses his magic to make copies of himself and rapidly defeats the soldiers, then engages Erlang in a duel, which includes a memorable shapeshifting fight and Wukong's attempt to evade Erlang by transforming himself into a house.

Seeing that Erlang and the Monkey are equally matched, Lao Tzu interferes, knocking Wukong unconscious, where he is quickly captured. Wukong is sentenced to death and a guillotine is used, but the blade breaks on the Monkey King's neck. A fire breather tries to burn Wukong to death, but he simply inhales the flames and exhales them over the fire breather, sending him running away on fire. A shower of golden arrows is then used, but only succeeds in sending Sun Wukong to sleep from boredom.

Lao Tzu suggests incinerating the Monkey King in his eight-way trigram furnace, since he is extremely durable due to his earlier consumption of the Pills of Immortality and the peaches.
After days of burning Sun Wukong in the furnace, Lao Tzu opens it, expecting to see nothing but ash, but instead sees two glowing lights which he mistakes for two Pills of Immortality. Reaching in, he discovers that they are actually Wukong's eyes, hardened by the time in the furnace rather than weakened. Breaking free, he destroys the furnace then destroys most of the Imperial palace, routs the Imperial guards and causes the Emperor to flee in disarray. A finally triumphant Wukong returns to the Flower and Fruit Mountain where he is greeted by his cheering subjects.

Influence
The name of the movie (大闹天宫) became a colloquialism in the Chinese language to describe someone making a mess. Countless cartoon adaptations that followed have reused the same classic story Journey to the West, yet many consider this 1964 iteration to be the most original, fitting and memorable.

DVD release
As part of the 40th anniversary of the second part's release, the film was re-released on a 2-disc special edition DVD in 2004. This edition is the original remastered Chinese version of the film, and contains Chinese subtitles in traditional and simplified characters. An English-subtitled version of the film has not been released, but fan-made English subtitles can be downloaded (see links section). After much demand, the original 106 minute version was released on a two disc VCD set. It contains several omitted and extended scenes that weren't included on the 40th anniversary version for unknown reasons.

Blu-Ray release
In 2012 the film was restored as well as being converted to 3D. The film's aspect ratio was changed from 1.33 to 1.78 by adding additional art to the backgrounds and at times moving the character placement within the frame. The film was shortened to 90 minutes by "speed[ing] up some of the action scenes."  The score and dialogue were re-recorded for a new Dolby 5.1 and 7.1 mix.

Awards
 Won the outstanding film award at the 1978 International London Film Festival.
 Won the 13th Special Interest award at the Czech Republic Karlovy Vary International Film Festival.
 Won the best art award and children's literature award at the 2nd Chinese film "Hundred Flowers" festival.

Production notes
 At the time, the film was also used as a joke metaphor for the "havoc" being caused by Mao Zedong (the monkey) in "heaven" (China).
Although it was never released in the majority of European countries, it was once broadcast on Swedish television during the mid-1980s with Hans Alfredson, who described scene for scene on what is happening. It also aired two or three times in the USSR in 80s, and became very popular among the youth. Furthermore, it was shown in Denmark in the 80s, voiced by Povl Dissing and in Germany in 1980.
It was also broadcast by the BBC in 1980, 1981 and 1983. The version broadcast is a longer edit than that of the 40th Anniversary DVD (approximately 107 minutes) and contains several extended and omitted scenes.
A fan-restoration project has completed restoring the film to its original length by splicing together several sources of the film (commercial releases and VHS recordings of original broadcasts).
The original film is approximately 106 minutes long, in contrast to the 40th Anniversary version which is 67 minutes long.

Sequels
At least two loose sequels were produced subsequently:
 人參果 (Ren Shen Guo) in 1981 - directed by Yan Ding Xian, English meaning "gin sen fruit" or "Monkey king and fruit of immortality" or "stealing Ginseng Fruit"
 金猴降妖 (Jinhou jiang yao / Jin hou xiang yao) in 1985 - most commonly translated as The Monkey King Conquers the Demon. Adaptation of the Baigujing story arc.
The main character of the movie has a cameo appearance in the second episode of the 2014 animated series "Super Wings" in a form of theatrical show.

See also
Calabash Brothers
History of animation
History of Chinese animation
Chinese animation
List of animated feature films

References

External links
 Journey to the West - Contains detailed information about the story.
 
 The film at China's Movie Database
 (Chinese) Pages at Xinhua News containing background information and many drawings.

1961 films
1964 films
Chinese animated films
1960s Mandarin-language films
Films based on Journey to the West
1961 animated films
1964 animated films